Stemonurus is a genus of plants in the family Stemonuraceae.

Species include:
Stemonurus ammui (Kaneh.) Sleumer
Stemonurus apicalis (Thwaites) Miers
Stemonurus celebicus Valeton
Stemonurus corrugatus Utteridge & Schori
Stemonurus dichrocarpus (Gagnep.) Sleumer
Stemonurus gitingensis (Elmer) Sleumer
Stemonurus grandifolius Becc.
Stemonurus malaccensis (Mast.) Sleumer
Stemonurus monticola (G.Schellenb.) Sleumer
Stemonurus perobtusus (Gagnep.) Sleumer
Stemonurus punctatus Becc.
Stemonurus scorpioides Becc.
Stemonurus secundiflorus Blume
Stemonurus umbellatus Becc.

References

Stemonuraceae
Asterid genera
Taxonomy articles created by Polbot